Bicentenaria (meaning "two hundred year anniversary"; named after the 200th anniversary of the 1810 May Revolution in Argentina) is a genus of carnivorous coelurosaurian theropods which lived during the early Late Cretaceous (about 90 million years ago) in what is now Argentina. It contains the type species, Bicentenaria argentina. This name was first reported in news articles in June 2012, and the paper describing it was formally published in August 2012.

References

Late Cretaceous dinosaurs of South America
Prehistoric coelurosaurs
Fossil taxa described in 2012
Taxa named by Fernando Novas
Candeleros Formation
Cretaceous Argentina